An adda is a "conversation" among members, who were originally of the same socio-economic strata, but the process has democratized in modern times. 

Adda was incorporated into the Oxford English Dictionary in 2004.

The Indian adda has shades of meaning attached to different languages:

In Hindi, adda is a noun, with the nominal form of the word meaning the location or nest of a group or community. The etymology can be traced to the original meaning of the word, which means the "perching spot or perch for birds".
In Bengali, adda is both a standalone noun and a noun in a noun-verb compound. The nominalization of the word has two senses — one being the Hindi sense, and the other being the place of ritual meeting and/or conversation of a group of people (i.e., a symposium). The verb form means informal conversation among a group of people, often for hours at an end, and usually accompanied by food.

In 2011, filmmakers Surjo Deb and Ranjan Palit made a documentary on the subject. The film, Adda: Calcutta, Kolkata has been screened at several festivals around the globe and won the Golden Palm Award at the Mexico International Film Festival 2012.

References
 

Bengali culture
Bengali words and phrases